Article Five may refer to:

 Article Five of the United States Constitution, Amending the Constitution
 Article 5 of the European Convention on Human Rights
 Article 5 of the North Atlantic Treaty, which brought NATO into existence
 Article 5 (novel), a novel by Kristen Simmons